Alexandria Garden District is located in Alexandria, Louisiana.  It was added to the National Register of Historic Places on April 9, 2001. Boundaries of the district are approximately described as Marye Street, Bolton Avenue, White Street, and Hynson Bayou. Only 15 percent of the 293 buildings included in the district are classified as non-contributing, a low rate among National Register Historic Districts in Louisiana.

Bolton High School falls within the district. Many city leaders of the 1940s through the 1970s lived in the Garden District.

References

Houses on the National Register of Historic Places in Louisiana
Colonial Revival architecture in Louisiana
Houses in Alexandria, Louisiana
Tourist attractions in Alexandria, Louisiana
Historic districts on the National Register of Historic Places in Louisiana
National Register of Historic Places in Rapides Parish, Louisiana